The 2021 Crosley Record Pressing 200 was a ARCA Menards Series East race held on May 8, 2021. It was contested over 200 laps on the  short track. It was the third race of the 2021 ARCA Menards Series East season. Joe Gibbs Racing driver Sammy Smith collected his second win of the season.

Background

Entry list 

 (R) denotes rookie driver.
 (i) denotes driver who is ineligible for series driver points.

Practice 

Qualifying
Mason Mingus earned the pole award, posting a time of 19.504 seconds and a speed of

Starting Lineups

Race

Race results

References 

2021 in sports in Tennessee
Crosley Record Pressing 200
2021 ARCA Menards Series East